The women's shot put event at the 2015 European Athletics Indoor Championships was held on 5 March 2015 at 16:30 (qualification) and 7 March, 18:15 (final) local time.

Medalists

Records

Results

Qualification
Qualification: Qualification Performance 17.85 (Q) or at least 8 best performers advanced to the final.

Final

References

2015 European Athletics Indoor Championships
Shot put at the European Athletics Indoor Championships
2015 in women's athletics